Origins Vol. 1 is the fifth studio album by American guitarist Ace Frehley, released on April 13, 2016 in Japan and April 15 in the United States. It is a covers album which features guest appearances from Slash, Lita Ford, John 5, Mike McCready, and Frehley's former Kiss bandmate Paul Stanley. The album was announced on February 11, 2016.

Album information
In addition to covers of tracks by Cream and Thin Lizzy, Origins Vol. 1 features newly recorded versions of several Kiss songs which were written but not sung by Frehley, such as "Cold Gin" and "Parasite", as well as a new version of the Kiss song "Rock and Roll Hell" from the Creatures of the Night album, which he never performed on, as he was leaving the band at the time.

In a 2016 interview with The Pods & Sods Network, Ace described other songs that were considered, recorded and about plans for Origins Vol. 2.

Reception
The album entered the Billboard 200 chart at number 23 selling 16,113 in its first week, but totaling 16,386 copies including streams and tracks.

Track listing

Personnel
Source: CD booklet

Ace Frehley  – lead vocals (all, except 4); rhythm, additional and lead guitars (all); bass guitar (1, 6-7, 9, 11-12), engineer (4), producer
Chris Wyse – bass guitar (2-5, 8, 10)
Scot Coogan – drums (1, 3, 5-11); lead vocals (1, 6)
Matt Starr – drums (2, 4, 12)
Ray Brandis – percussion (2, 6, 9, 11)
Warren Huart – harmony lead guitar (5)

Special Guests 
John 5  – guitar solo and lead guitar (3, 8)
Paul Stanley  – lead vocals and co-producer (4)
Slash  –  guitar solo and lead guitar (5)
Lita Ford  –  lead guitar and lead vocals (7)
Mike McCready  – guitar solo lead guitar (10)

Production
Warren Huart – producer (3, 7, 12), engineer, mixing
Ken Gullic – producer (12)
Sam Martin – engineer, mixing assistant
Alex Salzman – engineer
Mike Everett – engineer (2)
Josh Evans – overdubs engineer (10)
Greg Collins – vocals engineer (4)
Jonathan Burns – mixing assistant (4)
Pablo Valda, Eric Gonzales – mixing assistants
Adam Ayan – mastering

Charts

 The album reached #1 on the Billboard Hard Rock Albums Chart, and #4 on the Billboard Rock Album Charts.

References

External links
Ace Frehley official website
Warren Huart interview

2016 albums
Ace Frehley albums
Covers albums
Kiss (band)
MNRK Music Group albums